Gabriel T Robeniol (born June 7, 1961)  is a Filipino judge who is currently an associate justice of the Court of Appeals of the Philippines. He succeeded Justice Isias Dicdican who retired in June 2015. He currently serves as the senior member in the 8th Division of the Court of Appeals under the chairpersonship of Justice Manuel Barrios, and is serving alongside Michael Pastores Ong as its junior member.

References 

1956 births
Living people
Filipino judges
Justices of the Court of Appeals of the Philippines